The Australasian Union of Jewish Students (AUJS) is a federation of Jewish student societies at Australian and New Zealand universities and other higher education institutions. It was founded in 1948 at the University of Sydney and is affiliated with the World Union of Jewish Students. AUJS' constitution lists its four pillars as Judaism, activism, Zionism, and pluralism. AUJS runs social, educational, political and religious events on University campuses.

Principles
All of the organisation's activities are based on the four pillars of Judaism, Zionism, Pluralism and Activism.

Executive committee
AUJS' current Executive Committee members were elected at its Annual General Meeting on the 16th of August, 2021.

Conferences
AUJS runs various conferences throughout the year, including:
 Political Training Seminar
 JCA Millie Philips Leadership Training Summit
 Summer Camp
 Accelerate Winter Conference

Israel Programs
AUJS operates the Taglit-Birthright Israel programs for Australian students. This program offers students subsidised trips to Israel. Every year AUJS sends over 300 participants to Israel on these trips. AUJS also offers other Israeli-based programs, including the Leadership Development Program.

Constituent organisations
AUJS operates on national, regional and campus levels. Most Regional organisations have a representative on the National Executive. Similarly, each campus organisation has a representative on that Region's Executive. AUJS is an affiliate of the Zionist Federation of Australia and Executive Council of Australian Jewry.

Active campuses

Western Australia
 University of Western Australia
 Curtin University

New South Wales
 University of New South Wales
 University of Sydney
 Macquarie University
 University of Technology Sydney
 University of Wollongong

Queensland
 University of Queensland
 James Cook University

South Australia
 University of Adelaide
 Flinders University
 University of South Australia

Australian Capital Territory
 Australian National University

Victoria
 La Trobe Jewish Students' Society - LatJSS (La Trobe University)
 Monash Jewish Students' Society - MonJSS (Monash University)
 Melbourne University Jewish Students Society - MUJSS (The University of Melbourne)
 Swinburne University of Technology
 RMIT
 Deakin University
 Victoria University

New Zealand
 University of Auckland
 University of Otago

Tasmania
 University of Tasmania

See also
 Australian Association for Jewish Studies

References

External links
AUJS website
AUJS National Constitution as at 2020

Student societies in Australia
Jewish youth organizations
Jewish organizations established in 1948
Student religious organisations in Australia
Student religious organisations in New Zealand
Zionism in Australia
Jews and Judaism in Oceania